Bakassouck is a settlement in Bignona Department in Ziguinchor Region in Senegal.

In the 2002 census its population was recorded as 324 inhabitants in 45 households,.

References

External links
PEPAM

Populated places in the Bignona Department